The  Vyatka electoral district was a constituency created for the 1917 Russian Constituent Assembly election.

The electoral district covered the Vyatka Governorate. 8 out of 20 submitted candidate lists were disqualified. Cheremis ran on a joint list with the Popular Socialists.

Results
The account of American historian Oliver Henry Radkey (displayed in the table below) only includes full result for three lists (Bolsheviks, Mensheviks, Orthodox), albeit the number of votes for the Orthodox list has been rounded off. The real vote of the other nine lists, according to Radkey, would have been more than double what is accounted for.

In Vyatka town, the Kadets was the most voted party, with 4,082 votes (29.8%). The Bolsheviks received 2,474 votes (18.2%), the Mensheviks 2,000 votes (14.6%), the SRs 1,682 votes (12.3%), the Popular Socialist-Cheremi list 1,635 votes (11.9%), the Commercial-Industrial list 952 votes (7.1%), the Orthodox list 675 votes (4.9%), the Muslim Union 100 votes (0.7%), the left-wing SRs 53 votes (0.3%) and 25 votes for the remaining lists. In the Vyatka garrison the Bolsheviks obtained 1,491 votes (68.7%), the SRs 441 votes (20.3%), the Kadets 87 votes (4%), the Mensheviks 50 votes (2.3%), the SR left 32 votes (1.5%), the Commercial-Industrial list 11 votes (0.5%), the Muslim Union 10 votes (0.4%) and 6 votes for the remaining lists.

References

Electoral districts of the Russian Constituent Assembly election, 1917